Generacija 5 (trans. Generation 5) is a Serbian and Yugoslav rock band formed in Belgrade in 1977.

The mainstay members of the band are keyboardist and band leader Dragoljub Ilić and guitarist Dragan Jovanović. At the beginning of their career the band performed jazz rock. With the arrival of vocalist Goran Milošević, the band moved to hard rock, releasing a number of hits during the late 1970s and early 1980s. The band disbanded in 1982. In 1985 former members of the band played a pivotal role in YU Rock Misija, the Yugoslav contribution to Live Aid. Generacija 5 reunited in 1992 and is still active.

Band history

1977–1982
Generacija 5 was officially formed on July 1, 1977, by Dragoljub Ilić "Ilke" (a former Korak member, keyboards), Jovan Rašić (a former Zlatni Prsti member, vocals), Dragan "Krle" Jovanović (a former Zdravo member, guitar), Dušan "Duda" Petrović (a former Pop Mašina member, bass guitar) and Slobodan "Boban" Đorđević (a former Korak member, drums). The band was named after a suggestion by Dragan Ilić's brother, composer Aleksandar "Sanja" Ilić; after reading a newspaper article about fifth generation computers, Sanja Ilić suggested the name Generacija 5.

The band released their debut jazz rock-oriented 7-inch single with songs "Novi život" ("New Life") and "Izgubljeni san" ("Lost Dream") in May 1978. After the single release they performed on the rock evening of Subotica Youth Festival. Soon after, Petrović left the band due to his mandatory stint in the Yugoslav army, and was temporarily replaced by Miloš "Cajger" Stojisavljević. Upon his return from the army in May 1979, Petrović rejoined the band. In 1979 Generacija 5 released their second 7-inch single, with songs "Svemu dođe kraj" ("Everything Comes to an End") and "Noćni mir" ("Night Peace"). With "Noćni mir" they maintained their jazz rock orientation, but "Svemu dođe kraj" featured harder sound, marking the beginning of their shift towards hard rock. After the single release they performed at the Opatija Music Festival and won the Best Use of Traditional Music Elements Award.

In October 1979 Rašić left the band, and was replaced by a former Zebra member Goran Milošević (brother of female rock singer Slađana Milošević), with whom the band moved towards more commercial sound. In November 1979 they released their third 7-inch single, featuring "Umoran od svega" ("Tired of Everything") and their cult ballad "Ti samo budi dovoljno daleko" ("Just Stay Far Enough"). During the same year their music was used in Zoran Čalić's hit movie Foolish Years.

The band released their debut self-titled album, produced by Josip Boček, in 1980. The album brought the hits "Dolazim za 5 minuta" ("I'll Be Back In 5 Minutes"), featuring lyrics written by Bora Đorđević, "Ti i ja" ("You And Me"), "Rođen na asfaltu" ("Born on the Asphalt") and the ballad "Pseto" ("Dog"), written by Bora Đorđević and Kornelije Kovač. Yugoslav music critics, however, criticized the band for their lyrics and the fact that some of their biggest hits were written by the authors outside the band. The  second album Dubler (Doubler), produced by Peter Taggart, was released in 1982. Although the second album brought several hits, the band did not manage to maintain their popularity at the time of great popularity of Yugoslav new wave bands and disbanded in June 1982.

Post breakup
After the disbandment, Ilić became a Radio Television Belgrade editor. During the 1980s he composed songs for Željko Bebek, Slađana Milošević and other acts. Đorđević moved to the United States of America, Jovanović became a studio musician and Milošević joined the band Mama Co Co, performing with them for a while before withdrawing from the scene.

In 1985 Ilić wrote the song "Za milion godina" recorded by YU Rock Misija, the Yugoslav contribution to Live Aid. Former Generacija 5 members Dragan Jovanović, Dušan Petrović and Slobodan Đorđević all took part in the song recording.

1992–present
Generacija 5 reunited in 1992. Besides Dragan Ilić on keyboards, Dragan Jovanović on guitar and Miloš Stojisavljević on bass guitar, the band's new lineup featured the singer Đorđe David Nikolić, a graduate from the Belgrade Faculty of Dramatic Arts, and drummer Zoran Radovanović, formerly of Čutura i Oblaci. In 1994 the band released the compilation album Generacija 5 '78–'94, which featured their old hits, an unplugged version of "Ti samo budi dovoljno daleko" and two new songs, "Najjači samo ostaju" ("Only The Strongest Survive") and "Povedi me u noć" ("Take Me into the Night").

Their comeback album Svet je tvoj (The World Is Yours), released in 1997, was recorded in Belgrade and Los Angeles. In Belgrade they worked in studio with former Warriors member Dragan Deletić and in Los Angeles they were joined by their former member Slobodan Đorđević. The album was produced by Oliver Jovanović and band members themselves. The song "Nosi je košava" ("Košava Carries Her") featured lyrics written by deceased Nenad Radulović, a former frontman of the band Poslednja Igra Leptira. The album featured American rapper Baby Q Ball, singers Maja Odžaklijevska and Lana Toković and Ljuba Dimitrijević on crumhorn as guests. The album also featured recordings from Generacija 5 unplugged concert held in Television Belgrade Studio 9 in 1995 as bonus tracks. During their staying in Los Angeles the band performed at the Roxy Theatre.

At the beginning of 2000 Đorđe David was excluded from the band, Dragan Panjak becoming the band's new vocalist. He recorded only one song with the band, the ballad "Pomoli se još jednom..." ("Say One More Prayer..."). The song, composed by Ilić and with lyrics written by Alka Vuica, was originally recorded in 1984 by singer Željko Bebek. Generacija 5 version was released on the compilation album Pomoli se još jednom... i druge balade (Say One more Prayer... and Other Ballads) in 2000. In 2002, the band released the album Unplugged & Live, which featured the recordings from the 1995 Television Belgrade Studio 9 unplugged concert. The album, besides the band's hits in acoustic arrangements, featured an unplugged cover of Time song "Istina mašina" ("Truth Machine"). The band's original bass guitarist Dušan Petrović died on October 17, 2003.

In 2006 the band released their fourth studio album, Energija (Energy), produced by Saša Habić. The album featured, besides Ilić, Krstić and Stojisavljević, Slobodan Đorđević on drums, and, as a guest vocalist, former Smak singer Dejan Najdanović. On the promotional concerts the band performed with Najdanović as vocalist. In December 2011 the band reunited in the 1978 lineup, with Ilić on keyboards, Jovanović on guitar, Stojisavljević on bass guitar, Đorđević on drums, and Rašić on vocals, to perform at the 50th anniversary of Subotica Youth Festival. In 2013 the band started performing in the lineup featuring Dragan Ilić on keyboards, Dragan Jovanović on guitar, Miloš Stojisavljević on bass guitar, Dejan Najdanović on vocals, and Kerber member Josip "Joško" Hartl on drums, Najdanović and Hartl not being official, but touring members.

In November 2016, the band released the single "Opasna po život" ("Deadly"), with lyrics written by Van Gogh frontman Zvonimir Đukić. The song was recorded in the new lineup, with Slobodan Đorđević playing the drums and the new singer, Miloš Bajat. The band celebrated their 45th anniversary with the single "Freedom", released in November 2022, and a concert in Belgrade's Trade Union Hall, held on 8 December 2022, featuring musicians Dado Topić and Bora Đorđević and children's choir Horislavci as guests.

Legacy
The song "Svemu dođe kraj" was covered by Radio Television Novi Sad Big Band on their 1980 self-titled album. The song "Ti samo budi dovoljno daleko" was covered by singer-songwriter Srđan Marjanović on his 1989 album Ako jednom puknem ja (If I Go into Pieces One Day).

In 2000, the song "Dolazim za pet minuta" was polled No.53 on Rock Express Top 100 Yugoslav Rock Songs of All Times list. In 2011, the same song was polled, by the listeners of Radio 202, one of 60 greatest songs released by PGP-RTB/PGP-RTS during the sixty years of the label's existence.

Discography

Studio albums
Generacija 5 (1980)
Dubler (1982)
Svet je tvoj (1997)
Energija (2006)

Live albums
Unplugged & Live (2002)

Compilations
Generacija 5 78–94 (1994)
Pomoli se još jednom... (2000)

Singles
"Novi život" / "Izgubljeni san" (1978)
"Svemu dođe kraj" / "Noćni mir" (1979)
"Umoran od svega" / "Ti samo budi dovoljno daleko" (1979)
"Spakuj se, požuri" / "Samo laži" (1981)
"Opasna po život" (2016)

References

External links
 Generacija 5 at Discogs

Serbian rock music groups
Serbian jazz-rock groups
Serbian hard rock musical groups
Yugoslav rock music groups
Yugoslav jazz-rock groups
Yugoslav hard rock musical groups
Musical groups from Belgrade
Musical groups established in 1977